Fernand Émile Oriol (4 November 1900 – 12 January 1989) was a French rower. He competed in the men's eight event at the 1924 Summer Olympics alongside his brother André.

References

External links
 

1900 births
1989 deaths
French male rowers
Olympic rowers of France
Rowers at the 1924 Summer Olympics
Rowers from Paris